is a rhythm game created by Sega and Crypton Future Media for the Nintendo 3DS and the sequel to Hatsune Miku and Future Stars: Project Mirai. The game is also a spin-off of the Hatsune Miku: Project DIVA series of Vocaloid rhythm games and was first released on November 28, 2013 in Japan with no international release until September 2015. Like the original, the game primarily makes use of Vocaloids, a series of singing synthesizer software and the songs created using these vocaloids most notably the virtual-diva Vocaloid Hatsune Miku. It is also the second game to include a Vocaloid made by Internet Co., Ltd., Gumi.

Gameplay

While Project Mirai only had button controls, Project Mirai 2 adds use of touch screen controls where players tap the bottom screen. An increased sense of speed and additional gimmicks have also been added. In addition to hitting the markers on the touch screen with the right timing that goes with the song, the more difficult settings will increase it up to three different marker colors. The thicker lines seen on the trail will require players to hold down the touch screen part, and when it is rainbow-colored, players will be required to spin it around in circles.

The old style of play used in the first Project Mirai is still available, for those that prefer that, with a few new twists added. In addition to the A, B, X, and Y buttons, players also need to use the directional D pad for certain keys. Similar to the Touch Mode gameplay part, players will be required to hold down the buttons for the thicker lines. The rainbow colored parts can be done by rotating the Circle Pad in circles. There are also 2 Line parts that require both uses of the A, B, X, and Y buttons along with directional buttons, at the same time. The game also features a mini-game based on the Puyo Puyo series, known as "Puyo Puyo 39". The "My Room" and "Augmented Reality" feature also return in this game.

Hatsune Miku: Project Mirai Deluxe/DX

An updated version of Project Mirai 2 intended for worldwide release, Project Mirai Deluxe/DX makes the following changes:
 All videos were removed, and replaced with newly created real-time animations
 One new song was added
 Some charts were slightly modified
 Six songs were given exclusive new higher-difficulty charts
 A new mini-game based on Reversi.

Reception 

Hatsune Miku: Project Mirai DX received "generally favorable reviews" according to review aggregator Metacritic.

Morgan Sleeper of Nintendo Life called the game "one of the 3DS' greatest hits," stating, "Its rhythm game core is inspired and addictive, the presentation is charming and fun, and there's no shortage of activities to keep you happily busy between songs, with dress-up, interior decorating, choreography, and a full-on Puyo Puyo mode all providing enjoyable distractions from the dancefloor." GameRevolution gave the game a nine out of ten, praising the game for its controls, amount of songs, creation tools, and videos, while criticizing the distracting background videos. Kyle Burleson of Destructoid called the entry his "least favorite outing of hers in the realm of games," criticizing its lack of difficulty and praising the amount of content.

Song List

There are 48 songs (79 if different singers is counted).

17 (27) songs are brand new while 31 (52) songs are from previous games.

Songs with a gray background are returning songs from previous games.
Songs with a yellow background are songs exclusive to Project Mirai DX.

References

External links
Project Mirai 2's Official Site 
Project Mirai DX's Official Site 
Project Mirai DX's Official Site 

2013 video games
Music video games
Nintendo 3DS games
Nintendo 3DS-only games
Nintendo 3DS eShop games
Nintendo Network games
Sega video games
Creative works using vocaloids
Hatsune Miku: Project DIVA games
Video games developed in Japan